Kang Jeong-gu (born 11 May 1990) is a Korean handball player for Doosan and the Korean national team.

He represented Korea at the 2019 World Men's Handball Championship.

References

1990 births
Living people
Korean male handball players